SavaJe Technologies (pronounced savage) was the developer of the SavaJe OS, a Java OS for advanced mobile phones.
The SavaJe OS was a monolithic OS-and-Java platform, an implementation of Sun Microsystems' Java Standard Edition, as opposed to
the more limited Micro Edition usually offered on mobile phones.  The SavaJe Java platform included a full implementation of Java Swing,
enabling developers to create applications with richer user interfaces.

At the 2006 JavaOne conference, their Jasper S20 phone was the "Device of Show".

In April 2007 Sun Microsystems announced their intention to buy the intellectual property assets of SavaJe, these assets were used in the now defunct JavaFX Mobile product, which was unrelated to the JavaFX UI technology released by Oracle.

In August 2010, Oracle sued Google for infringement of Java-related copyrights and patents. In September 2010, the Mass High Tech Journal reported that the inspiration of Android technology has strong ties to the creation and development of the SavaJe platform.

References

External links 
 SavaJe Falls on Hard Times
 New Java OS runs on "bare metal"
 Sun acquires Java-based mobile phone OS
 SavaJe Official Website on the Internet Archive

Computer companies established in 1999
Computer companies disestablished in 2006
Defunct computer companies of the United States
Privately held companies based in Massachusetts
Sun Microsystems acquisitions
1999 establishments in Massachusetts
2006 mergers and acquisitions